Roger A. Bruns (born 1941) is an author and the former deputy director for the National Archives and Records Administration of the United States. His books have included Preacher : Billy Sunday and big-time American evangelism, Almost History, an anthology of historical American documents which were about the subsequent course of American history, as well as biographies of Billy Graham, Jesse Jackson, Martin Luther King Jr., and George Washington.

Selected works 

 The Damndest Radical (1987), a biography of Ben Reitman

References

External links
 Roger Bruns at Greenwood Publishing Group
 CNN Chat Transcript with Roger Bruns

American archivists
American biographers
American male biographers
21st-century American historians
21st-century American male writers
Living people
1941 births
Place of birth missing (living people)
American male non-fiction writers